Barricade is a 2012 Canadian psychological horror film directed by Andrew Currie. The film stars Eric McCormack. The film was released on September 9, 2012. It is the first film entirely produced by WWE Studios to not feature a wrestler in any way. It was widely panned by critics and audiences.

Plot
Barricade tells the story of Terence Shade, a psychologist who doesn't have enough time in the day to spend with his kids. His wife wants them all to go to her old family cabin way, way, way up in the mountains to give the kids a white Christmas. The story jumps to a year later, and Shade's wife has died under mysterious circumstances, but he wants to honor her wishes and takes their two kids to the cabin. Once there, strange noises and shadows begin to terrorize the family ... or has madness overtaken them?

Cast

References

External links
 
 
 

2012 films
2012 horror films
2012 independent films
2012 horror thriller films
2010s Christmas horror films
American horror thriller films
Canadian horror thriller films
American psychological horror films
American psychological thriller films
Canadian psychological thriller films
English-language Canadian films
American Christmas horror films
2010s English-language films
Canadian independent films
American post-apocalyptic films
Canadian post-apocalyptic films
WWE Studios films
American independent films
Films directed by Andrew Currie
2010s American films
2010s Canadian films